Pseudospora is a genus of parasitic cercozoans.

It includes the species Pseudospora volvocis.

Taxonomy
 Order Pseudosporida Hibberd 1983 sensu Cavalier-Smith 1993
 Family Pseudosporidae Kent 1880 emend. Berlese 1888
 Genus Pseudospora Cienkowski 1865 non Schiffner 1931
 Species P. aculeata Zopf 1884
 Species P. bacillariacearum Zopf [Pseudosporopsis bacillariacearum (Zopf) Scherff. 1925]
 Species P. benedeni De Bruyne 1889
 Species P. edax De Bruyne 1889
 Species P. eudorini Roskin 1927
 Species P. cienkowskiana Sorokin 1877
 Species P. leptoderma Scherff. 1925
 Species P. lindstedtii Hartog 1890
 Species P. maligna Zopf 1884
 Species P. maxima Sorokin 1877
 Species P. myzocytioides Scherff. 1925
 Species P. nitellarum Cienkowski
 Species P. parasitica (Cienkowski 1858) [Monas parasitica Cienkowski 1858]
 Species P. perforans 
 Species P. rotatoriorum Scherffel 1925
 Species P. rovignensis Schussing 1929
 Species P. subsalsa Dangead 1912
 Species P. volvocis Cienkowski 1865

References

Sarcomonadea
Cercozoa genera